The 2016 Southern Conference football season was the 95th season of college football for the Southern Conference (SoCon) and formed a part of the 2016 NCAA Division I FCS football season.

Head coaches

Russ Huesman, Chattanooga – 8th year
Brent Thompson, The Citadel – 1st year
Carl Torbush, East Tennessee State – 2nd year
Bruce Fowler, Furman – 6th year
Bobby Lamb, Mercer – 4th year

Chris Hatcher, Samford – 2nd year
Scott Wachenheim, VMI – 2nd year
Mark Speir, Western Carolina – 5th year
Mike Ayers, Wofford – 29th year

Preseason poll results
First place votes in parentheses

Preseason All-Conference Teams
Offensive Player of the Year: Detrez Newsome, Jr., RB (Western Carolina)
Defensive Player of the Year: Keionta Davis, Sr., DL (Chattanooga)

Rankings

Regular season

All times Eastern time.

Rankings reflect that of the Sports Network poll for that week.

Week One

Players of the week:

Week Two

Players of the week:

Week Three

Players of the week:

Week Four

Players of the week:

Week Five

Players of the week:

Week Six

Players of the week:

Week Seven

Players of the week:

Week Eight

Players of the week:

Week Nine

Players of the week:

Week Ten

Players of the week:

Week Eleven

Players of the week:

Week Twelve

Players of the week:
Not released

Week Thirteen

Records against other conferences

FCS conferences

FBS conferences

Attendance

References